Herve Patient Prudence Nshimirimana (born 15 August 1999) is a Swedish footballer who plays for Landskrona BoIS.

Career

Club career
Prudence started playing football at the age of 10 at Bjuvs IF. He soon joined Billesholms GIF, before moving to Högaborgs BK. He got his first team debut for Högaborgs BK in 2015.

On 5 December 2019 it was confirmed, that Prudence would join Landskrona BoIS for the 2020 season, signing a deal until the end of 2021.

Personal life
Born in Sweden, Prudence is of Burundian descent.

References

1999 births
Living people
Swedish footballers
Swedish people of Burundian descent
Swedish sportspeople of African descent
Association football midfielders
Högaborgs BK players
Falkenbergs FF players
Tvååkers IF players
Landskrona BoIS players
Allsvenskan players
Ettan Fotboll players